This is a list of seasons completed by the Sokil Kiev professional ice hockey club. This list documents the records and playoff results for all seasons Sokil completed in the Soviet Hockey League and the Belarusian Extraleague.

Soviet League (1963-1992)

Note: GP = Games played, W = Wins, L = Losses, T = Ties, GF = Goals for, GA = Goals against, Pts = Points

1. Finished first portion of season 10th overall of 12. Teams placed 6-12 relegated to complete season with top 12 teams from Class A2. Group finish 6th of 18
2. Playoff entry was decided by Olympic style round-robin play between 4 divisions.

International Hockey League (1992-1996)
Note: GP = Games played, W = Wins, L = Losses, T = Ties, GF = Goals for, GA = Goals against, Pts = Points

3. 1st, Second Division / 7th, Western Conference 
4. 13th, Western Conference

Eastern European Hockey League (1996-2004)

Note: GP = Games played, W = Wins, OW = Overtime wins, T = Ties, OL = Overtime losses, L = Losses, GF = Goals for, GA = Goals against, Pts = Points

5. Energy Elektrenai forfeited game 2

Belarusian Open League (2004-2007)

Note: GP = Games played, W = Wins, OW = Overtime wins, T = Ties, OL = Overtime losses, L = Losses, GF = Goals for, GA = Goals against, Pts = Points

Russian Major League (2007-2009)
Note: GP = Games played, W = Wins, OW = Overtime wins, SW = Shootout wins, SL = Shootout losses, OL = Overtime losses, L = Losses, GF = Goals for, GA = Goals against, Pts = Points

References
General

Specific
 

Sokil Kyiv
Sokil Kyiv